Stenoplesictis is an extinct genus of carnivorous cat-like mammals belonging to the superfamily Aeluroidea, from Europe (Quercy, France) and Asia (Mongolia) (S. indigenus), from the Oligocene 33.9—28.4 Ma, existing for about .

Stenoplesictis is shown to have an omnivorous diet or more precisely, hypercarnivorous to mesocarnivorous.

Taxonomy
Stenoplesictis was named by Filhol (1880). It was assigned to the Aeluroidea by Hunt (1989) and Hunt (1998); to  the Viverridae by Flynn (1998); and reassigned to the Stenoplesictidae by Morlo et al. (2007).

References

Oligocene feliforms
Prehistoric mammals of Europe
Prehistoric carnivoran genera
Feliforms